Chop Socky Chooks is a computer-animated action series produced by Aardman Animations, Decode Entertainment, and Cartoon Network Europe that ran on Cartoon Network from 7 March 2008 until 24 July 2009. It was created and directed by Sergio Delfino, a prominent animator at Sony Pictures Imageworks. 26 episodes were produced.

The show previously aired on Cartoon Network throughout the United Kingdom, the United States, and much of the world, as well as Teletoon in Canada, and ABC3 in Australia. The name is from "chop socky", which is slang for the Asian martial arts film genre, and "chook", which is an Australian and New Zealand slang reference for chicken.

Premise
The show is about a trio of kung fu fighting chickens who live and work in a city-sized shopping mall owned by their archenemy, Dr. Wasabi.

Characters

The Chop Socky Chooks
 Chickadee "Chick P" Pao (voiced by Shelley Longworth) – Chickadee Pao is the most mature of the team and is the only female, as well as the one with the most leadership skills. In her childhood, she had a best friend named Oni (currently a villain known as Deadeye) whom she would play Blind Man's Bluff. She has personal issues with Dr. Wasabi who destroyed her home to build Wasabi World. Her daytime job is working as an electrician in the pipes of Wasabi World, and she wears historical Chinese female attire. Her battle weapon is her razor fans. She is based on Lucy Liu.
 K.O. Joe (voiced by Paterson Joseph) – K.O. Joe is the most energetic and brash team member. His daytime job is running a comic book shop. He shows great skills with handling troubled youth and skateboarding, and fancies himself as a ladies' man. His main battle weapon is a grappling hook hair pick, and his biggest fear is insects as he remembers them crawling into his afro as a child. He is also afraid of jelly beans due to having one stuck up his nose as a baby. He eventually learns he is the estranged son of Bantam. He is based on Jim Kelly, and as such, his clothes have a 1970s aesthetic.
 Charles "Chuckie" Chan (voiced by Rob Rackstraw (U.K.), Chris Hardwick (U.S.)) – Chuckie Chan was once a student of Master Yoshi learning the fighting style "Pow Kung". He wears a stereotypical martial artist's outfit and sports a Fu Manchu moustache, and his daytime job is teaching the youth of Wasabi World his martial arts. He had an old rival named Koby/Kobura. He is known to use proverbs in almost every episode. His battle weapon is his spiritual chi energy. He is based on various Hong Kong martial artists and named after Jackie Chan. His voice changed when the series aired on Cartoon Network in the United States to avoid offending Asian audiences.

Main villains
 Dr. Fish Wasabi (voiced by Paul Kaye) – Dr. Wasabi is the ruler of Wasabi World and is the main antagonist of the show. He is a little piranha that has an astronaut-like attire with water filled inside (so as to allow him to breathe) and speaks in a German accent. He has control of every place in Wasabi World. He is armed with his top henchman Bubba and his Ninja Chimps. His name is retained from his green wasabi-like skin color. As the title song implies, Wasabi is bad at thinking things though.
 Bubba (voiced by Rupert Degas) – Bubba is a large ape and wears a suit along with a top hat. Although highly unintelligent and initially illiterate, he's big in the heart. He has the dumb and strong personality like many cartoon characters. He has proved himself very useful, besides his impressive strength. His favorite comic book hero is Captain Cockroach and enjoys reading comic books after learning to read.
Ninja Chimps (voiced by Bentley Jones) – A group of chimpanzees trained in ninjitsu that serve as Dr. Wasabi's foot soldiers. They mainly serve as henchmen for Dr. Wasabi and Bubba.

Other villains
 The Omnioni (voiced by Rupert Degas) – An ancient demon who is supposed to be so powerful and evil that he had to be bottled up by the Lord of the Underworld. In Big Bad Bubba, he possesses Bubba in an attempt to open a portal to the underworld. However, Bubba's inability to read slowed him down long enough for Chick P to make Bubba sneeze Omnioni out of him and was sucked into the portal.
 Kobura (voiced by June-itchi Kanemaru) – A cobra-like creature who was Chuckie Chan's rival since before the show's history. According to his master, Kobi is bad-tempered. After he was bitten by cobras, he changed into an insane, merciless megalomaniac and for this reason, was banished forever (he also has a fork in his tongue). Soon, years later, Kobi becomes a powerful snake-like being with the ability to possess great strength, control cobras, and deadly venom that will explode a person's heart by sunset. In "Kobura Strikes", the Chooks were poisoned by Kobura and his snakes and attempt to find the cure before sundown. When they were finally cured, Kobura lunges toward K.O. Joe only to fall off a tower where his final battle with Chuckie took place. He, however, appears again in "Snake in the Class", this time revealing the Chop Socky Chooks secret identities and appears to be able to hypnotize people. This attempt failed as well though. Kobura is shown to be even more intelligent and ruthless than Doctor Wasabi while his voice appears to be a parody of John Hurt's.
 Oni/Deadeye (voiced by Tracy-Ann Oberman)- She appeared in the episode "If Looks Could Kill". She is a white viper who likes wearing goth-lolita. As a child, she used to be Chick P's best friend but apparently had a left eye condition. She was extremely envious. She said "You win again Chickadee. You always win!" with vain as they played "Blind Mans Bluff". Dr. Wasabi used this to his advantage and taught her to use her evil eye (which is why she donned the name Deadeye). Once she came into town, she greeted her friend but then left to settle business with Wasabi. As Deadeye, Oni is the one who actually made Chick P's father allow Wasabi to break it down, as she specializes in hypnosis and altering reality. Chick P uses a mirror to reflect the power of her evil eye, thus destroying its reign of terror. As Chick P is about to finish her, she says "Wait! Dee, please! I can't control it, and neither can you" and then crawls up a pipe, leaving a sad Chick P and a dazed K.O. Joe and Chuckie to regret. Her eye might be a reference to the curse Evil Eye.

Other characters
 Professor Shericon – Chick P's old mentor. He has a spider-like appearance and a Jimmy Stewart-like voice. He appeared in the episode "Double Trouble" where Dr. Wasabi used him to create robotic clones of the Chop Socky Chooks. His name is a play on "Shuriken" and "Silicon".
 Citizens of Wasabi World – An assortment of these appear in every episode.
The most commonly seen one is a large, fat lady with white skin, a green kimono, red lipstick, and black hair tied in a bun, who appears to have a huge crush on Chuckie Chan when his cover was blown, shown in the episode "Snake in the Class".
 The Cabbage Lady –  A woman with a cabbage. She appeared in "If Looks Could Kill" when Deadeye disguised herself as her. Her only line was "Cabbage?" She appears again in "Snake in the Class" when she is being mugged by hoodlums. In this episode, she appears without her cabbage and says other things than what she said in the past. Voiced by Jules de Jongh.
 Siren Sung – A mermaid songstress who can't sing very well. Chuckie Chan had a huge crush on her and thought that she had the best voice in the world (in the episode Karaoke Zombies it was revealed they were both tone deaf). She almost married Dr. Wasabi (Chuckie Chan and Dr. Wasabi fought over her), only because of his wealth, later in the episode she dumps him after realizing what a selfish materialist he is, but got sucked down a drain. She fell down when Chuckie Chan accidentally let go of her while reaching for the six dollars he owed her (Chuckie Chan got her to sign something and she wrote 'To a special someone' and she said that it was $5 for the CD and $1 for the love huck). Voiced by Jules de Jongh.
 Chuckie's Master – A one-eyed old Chinese man who was the master of Chuckie and Kobi when they were kids. He first appears in "Kobura Strikes". He appears in person in "His Master's Choice". He also appears in "The Lamest Show on Earth". Voiced by Jimmy Hibbert
 Chuckie's Students – Recurring characters in the show. These include a germaphobe boy with green skin named Itchi (Triggerfish - voiced by June-itchi Kanemaru), a skater/gamer girl with yellow skin named Umé (Hen - voiced by Josephine Wyatt), a boy with dark skin and always appears with a basketball named Stroose, a kimono girl named Cho, and a boy with blue skin named Raco. Raco (Dung Beetle - voiced by Rob Rackstraw), Stroose (Slaying Mantis - voiced by Harvey Davidson), and Cho (Lady Bug - voiced by Jules de Jongh) briefly became Junior Chooks in "Snake in the Class". In "Game Over Chooks!" it is revealed that Ume and Itchi are related.
 Iron Butt Monks – A trio of Chinese monks with fat iron butts (as their name suggests). In "Return the Other Cheek", Wasabi enlists Bubba to steal the Twin Cheeks, but was only able to steal one, and Bubba leaves behind one of Joe's 'fro combs as proof that the Chooks were responsible for stealing the Twin Cheeks. Their iron butts, as Chuckie explained in two of three episodes in which they appeared, came from their training; they threw their butts onto buckets of sand, hot coals, and finally, molten lava. This gave them their steel derrières, which are extremely hard, and they honed their powers, learning their most powerful attack, the Fiery Butt-Blast of Fury. One is voiced by Alan Marriott.
 Hairy Sumo Brothers – A duo of sumos named Larry and Harry with hair all over their bodies (as their name suggests). In "The Codfather", Wasabi fires Bubba for the Hairy Sumo Brothers and aids Wasabi in stealing money for himself. Larry was voiced by Glenn Wrage.
 Mother Superior – A one-eyed Squid dressed up as a nun who is the mother of the Iron Butt Monks.
 Bantam – He is Wasabi's nemesis. He is implied to be K.O. Joe's father and has a striking resemblance to Batman (his name is even an anagram).
 Squirt – He is a little teddy bear type thing who helps the Chop Socky Chooks get out of the jungle. K.O. calls him Cuddley sidekick. He is pink with brown stripes.
 House Seller – He is a fish type thing who appears in episode 12 that sells houses to the enemy. Voiced by Jared Stamm.
 Dark Rye – A bone-crossed skull with eyeballs (he has one blue eye and one grey eye) dressed as a pigtail, who is The Cabbage Lady's best friend. Voiced by Tom Clarke-Hill.

Episodes

Cast
 Rupert Degas as Bubba
 Rob Rackstraw as Chuckie Chan (U.K.) / Dung Beetle 
 Chris Hardwick as Chuckie Chan (U.S.)
 Paterson Joseph as K.O. Joe
 Paul Kaye as Dr. Wasabi
 Shelley Longworth as Chick P.
 Glenn Wrage as Larry Sumo
 Alan Marriott as Iron Butt Monk
 Jules de Jongh as Siren Sung / Cabbage Lady / Cho
 Jared Stamm as House Seller
 Marc Silk
 Jimmy Hibbert
 David Menkin
 Justin Fletcher
 Tom Clarke-Hill
 Tracy-Ann Oberman as Oni/Deadeye
 Kulvinder Ghir
 Danny John-Jules
 Keir Stewart
 Sandra Oh

Crew
 Richard Hansom – Voice Director

Home media

Reception
The series was received negatively among critics and audiences. The criticism was for its content being too violent for children, boring storytelling and ugly and two-dimensional characters.
Common Sense Media gave the show 2 out of 5 stars, complaining the show was too violent for children.

References

External links
 Chop Socky Chooks on Internet Movie Database

2000s British children's television series
2000s British animated television series
2008 British television series debuts
2009 British television series endings
2000s Canadian animated television series
2008 Canadian television series debuts
2008 Canadian television series endings
British children's animated action television series
British children's animated adventure television series
British children's animated fantasy television series
British computer-animated television series
Canadian children's animated action television series
Canadian children's animated adventure television series
Canadian children's animated fantasy television series
Canadian computer-animated television series
Anime-influenced Western animated television series
English-language television shows
Cartoon Network original programming
Teletoon original programming
Television series by Aardman Animations
Television series by DHX Media
Television series by Corus Entertainment
Television series about chickens